Goriče may refer to:

 Goriče, Kranj, a village in Slovenia
 Goriče, Postojna, a village in Slovenia
 Goriče pri Famljah, a village in Slovenia
 Srednja Vas–Goriče, a village in Slovenia

See also
 Gorice (disambiguation)